Megan Clarken (born 30 October 1966) is a media executive and former youth athlete from New Zealand. In November 2019, Clarken was appointed chief executive officer at Criteo, an ad-tech company based in France.

Athletic career

Clarken grew up in Auckland, New Zealand, one of four children and spent her youth focused on track and field. She represented New Zealand from a young age in the 100M, 200M, high jump, long jump and heptathlon events. When she was 12 years old, she broke a world age record in high jump.

In 1984, Clarken represented Oceania at the World Cup in Canberra, Australia. Although aiming for Olympic and Commonwealth selection, Clarken suffered a serious injury to her left knee and retired from track and field.

Clarken still holds four records in long jump and 100M in New Zealand.

Business career

Clarken has held senior leadership positions for large publishers and online technology providers in Australia, including Akamai Technologies and measurement company Nielsen, which she joined in 2004. She worked for Nielsen until 2019, having risen to the position of chief commercial officer for Nielsen Global Media. In 2019, Clarken became chief executive officer at Criteo, and was added to Criteo’s Board of Directors in 2020.

Affiliations and awards

Clarken has received leadership awards including the 2015 Cynopsis Media: Top Women in Digital Industry Leaders, the 2016 Multichannel News: Wonder Women and the 2019 National Organization for Women: Women of Power and Influence.

References 

1966 births
Living people
New Zealand female high jumpers
New Zealand female long jumpers
New Zealand heptathletes
New Zealand female sprinters
New Zealand business executives
New Zealand expatriates in France